The Platytera Monastery, formally the Holy Monastery of the Most Holy Mother of God Platytera, is a Greek Orthodox monastery in the city of Corfu in Greece.

It was founded in 1741 and finished in 1743, during the last period of Venetian rule. It was then rebuilt after being almost destroyed in the Siege of Corfu (1798–1799). It is notable as the burial place of the first governor of independent Greece, Ioannis Kapodistrias.

References 

Greek Orthodox monasteries in Greece
Buildings and structures in Corfu (city)
Christian monasteries established in the 18th century
Ioannis Kapodistrias